InterAirports is a subsidiary of Grupo Terra; company who administed four honduran international airports from 2000 to 2020, as a part of a twenty-year concession agreement.

 La Ceiba – Golosón International Airport
 Roatán – Juan Manuel Gálvez International Airport
 San Pedro Sula – Ramón Villeda Morales International Airport
 Tegucigalpa – Toncontín International Airport

See also
 List of airports in Honduras

References

Companies of Honduras
Airports in Honduras